"You on My Mind" is a song by the British pop group Swing Out Sister. It was the lead-off single from the group's second album, Kaleidoscope World. It featured a more sophisticated blend of musical components.

Music video
The music video was strongly inspired by the 1968 cult film, The Thomas Crown Affair.

Remixes

You On My Mind (Vinyl 7") 872964-7
"You On My Mind" (Album Version) - (3:36)
"Coney Island Man" - (3:38)

You On My Mind (CD Maxi) 874 229-2
"You On My Mind" (Album Version) - (3:36)
"Coney Island Man" - (3:38)
"Precious Words (Earth Bound Mix) - (3:46)
"You On My Mind" (12" Mix) - (6:32)

You On My Mind (Vinyl 12") 872 965-1, SWING 612
"You On My Mind" (Extended Version) - (6:32)
"You On My Mind" (Alternate Version) - (3:29)
"Coney Island Man" - (3:38)

Charts

References

1989 singles
Swing Out Sister songs
1989 songs
Fontana Records singles
Songs written by Andy Connell
Songs written by Corinne Drewery
Songs written by Paul Staveley O'Duffy